Causapscal station is a Via Rail station in Causapscal, Quebec, Canada. It is located at 142 Rue St-Jacques Sud near the end of Rue Cartier, and is a flag stop with no ticket sales. Causapscal is served by Via Rail's Ocean; the Montreal – Gaspé train has been out of service since 2013. Both trains shared the same rail line between Montreal and Matapédia.

References

External links

Via Rail page for the Ocean
Via Rail page for the Montreal – Gaspé train

Via Rail stations in Quebec
Railway stations in Bas-Saint-Laurent